The Men's individual pursuit competition at the 2018 UCI Track Cycling World Championships was held on 2 March 2018.

Results

Qualifying
The first two racers will race for gold, the third and fourth fastest rider will race for the bronze medal.

Finals
The finals were started at 20:11.

References

Men's individual pursuit
UCI Track Cycling World Championships – Men's individual pursuit